Family Law is a 2006 internationally co-produced comedy-drama film, written and directed by Daniel Burman.

The picture was produced by Diego Dubcovsky, José María Morales, and Marc Sillam, and co-produced by Amedeo Pagani.
Family Law was Argentina's official submission for the 2004 Academy Award for Best Foreign Language Film.

Plot
The film tells the story of Ariel Perelman (Daniel Hendler).  While he has an easygoing lifestyle, he's trying to find his way in life in Buenos Aires, Argentina. He works at a university as a law professor. The film begins with a long narration of the way things stand in his life.  He describes his father, Bernardo Perelman (Arturo Goetz), in detail. Perelman, as he's known, is a popular public defender who meets his clients where they work or in restaurants so he can determine what they are "all about." Most of his clients are generally poor.  He's very close to his secretary (Adriana Aizenberg) since his wife died fifteen years ago.  Work fills Perelman's days, and Ariel is astonished by his energy.

After lusting after Sandra (Julieta Díaz), an attractive woman who takes his class, Ariel decides to chase her and takes the Pilates class she teaches. Not much happens until Sandra is sued for teaching Pilates without the approval of the company who hold the rights to teach Pilates in Argentina.  Ariel (known as Perelman to Sandra) reaches out to his father for help and wins the law suit.

In the process, Sandra falls in love with the younger Perelman and they marry.  She begins to decorate their home for a few years and they have a child they name Gastón (Eloy Burman), who is a quite charming young boy.

Ariel's university building is shut down for a month because it had collapsed, and he is given some time off.  However, he doesn't share this news with his wife.  During this time his father starts spending some quality time with Ariel, which makes him think something must be wrong.  Ariel is asked by the Swiss kindergarten school Gastón attends to participate in a play and swim classes with the other fathers. Ariel first rebels but gives in.

The film ends with his father's death and burial and a long introspective look at Ariel Perelman's life in his 30s.

Cast
 Daniel Hendler as Ariel Perelman
 Arturo Goetz as Bernardo Perelman
 Eloy Burman as Gastón Perelman
 Julieta Díaz as Sandra
 Adriana Aizemberg as Norita
 Jean Pierre Reguerraz as uncle Eduardo Perelman
 Dmitry Rodnoy as Germán
 Luis Albornoz as Echechuny
 Darío Lagos as uncle Mamuñe
 Damián Dreizik as Damidjian
 Gerardo del Águila as Peruano (Peruvian)

Background
Derecho de familia is part of a loose trilogy of films. The other two are: Esperando al mesías (2000) and El abrazo partido (2004). All were written and directed by Burman and star Daniel Hendler. They are largely autobiographical, dealing with the life of a young Jew in contemporary Buenos Aires.

Like the characters in the film, Burman's own father was a lawyer and he also went to law school.

Eloy Burman who plays Gastón Perelman is the young son of director Daniel Burman.

Distribution
The film was first presented at the Berlin International Film Festival on February 10, 2006.  It was first screened in Argentina on March 16, 2006 at the Mar del Plata Film Festival. It opened wide in Argentina on March 23, 2006.

The film was shown at various film festivals, including: the Toulouse Latin America Film Festival, France; the Moscow Film Festival, Russia; the Karlovy Vary Film Festival, Czech Republic; the Edinburgh Film Festival, Scotland; the Helsinki International Film Festival, Finland; Films From The South Festival, Norway; the Chicago International Film Festival, USA; the Warsaw Film Festival, Poland; and others.

The film was released on DVD in Argentina on July 7, 2006 by Argentina Video Home.

Reception

Critical response
Family Law garnered mostly positive reviews from film critics. On review aggregate website Rotten Tomatoes, the film holds an overall 73% "Certified Fresh" approval rating based on 41 reviews, with a rating average of 6.7 out of 10. The site's consensus is: "What Family Law lacks in overt drama and conflict, it more than makes us with warm performances and smart, sharp dialogue." At Metacritic, which assigns a weighted mean rating out of 0–100 reviews from film critics, the film has a rating score of 66 based on 18 reviews, classified as a generally favorably reviewed film.

Jonathon Holland, film critic of Variety magazine, liked the film's story and wrote, "A deft, witty and emotionally rewarding study of a thirtysomething man in his roles as father and son, Daniel Burman's intensely personal "Family Law" completes his fatherhood trilogy. The second installment, "Lost Embrace", won the Silver Bear at Berlin in 2004. Again featuring an outstanding Daniel Hendler (best actor in 2004) and a script that fuses sharp observation with the intimacy of a lightly rewritten autobiography, pic effortlessly takes the viewer through a range of thoughts and moods. Fans of "Embrace" might lament the relative absence of social context this time, but pic's multiple merits should consolidate helmer's [sic] burgeoning offshore reputation."

The senior film writer at the San Francisco Chronicle, Ruthe Stein, liked the comedy drama's screenplay, the direction and acting, writing, "Family Law—a subtly perceptive charmer that was Argentina's entry for a best foreign film Oscar and might have been nominated in a less competitive year—is in no particular hurry to get where it's going...Although Hendler and Goetz don't really look alike, they manage to convey a family resemblance in their mannerisms, particularly the erect way they carry themselves, as if they're somebody...Aizemberg works wonders. You get the sense from her radiance that the secretary has always had a thing for her boss. His wife's death allowed her to finally express it physically, and she's overjoyed by their intimacy...Ultimately this is a movie about a son's discovery of the man he knows mostly as a father. It's a serious subject handled with humor—not the ha-ha kind, but the hard laughter that comes from recognizing parts of yourself in the Perelmans."

Critics Frederic and Mary Ann Brussat, of the website Spirituality and Practice like the film and wrote, "Family Law explores in a realistic and touching way the emotional barriers that often block intimate conversation between fathers and sons...It's easy today to send e-mails and faxes anywhere in the world, yet we rarely speak to those who live in our neighborhood. We have cellular telephones and pagers, yet we spend very little time in deep conversation with those in our immediate family. This strange phenomenon is depicted very poignantly in this snappy and satisfying film from Argentina written and directed by Daniel Burman. We were very impressed with his Lost Embrace about a father and son reunion after years apart. This one also deals with a father and son relationship."

Awards
Wins
 Mar del Plata Film Festival: Audience Award; Best Ibero-American Film; SIGNIS Award; all for Daniel Burman; 2006.
 Clarín Entertainment Awards: Clarín Award Best Film Screenplay, Daniel Burman; Best Supporting Film Actress, Adriana Aizemberg; 2006.
 Argentine Film Critics Association Awards: Silver Condor, Best Director, Daniel Burman; Best Supporting Actor, Arturo Goetz; 2007.

Nominations
 Mar del Plata Film Festival: Best Film, Daniel Burman; 2006.
 Argentine Film Critics Association Awards: Silver Condor, Best Actor, Daniel Hendler; Best Actress, Julieta Díaz; Best Film; 2007.

References

External links
  Official Web-site
 
 Derecho de familia at the cinenacional.com 
 Derecho de familia film review at La Nación by Diego Battle 
 Derecho de familia trailer at YouTube 

2006 films
2006 comedy-drama films
2006 independent films
Argentine independent films
Argentine comedy-drama films
2000s Spanish-language films
French independent films
French comedy-drama films
Italian independent films
Italian comedy-drama films
Spanish independent films
Spanish comedy-drama films
Films directed by Daniel Burman
Films about lawyers
2000s Argentine films
2000s French films
2000s Spanish films
2000s Italian films